Misbrookea is a genus of South American plants in the groundsel tribe within the sunflower family. The genus is named in honour of Miss Winifred M. A. Brooke.

Species
The only known species is Misbrookea strigosissima,  native to Peru and Bolivia.

References

External links
photo of type specimen at Field Museum in Chicago

Senecioneae
Monotypic Asteraceae genera
Flora of South America